Nina Saeedyokota (born ) is a Japanese group rhythmic gymnast. She represented her nation at international competitions. 

She participated at the 2012 Summer Olympics in London. 
She also competed at world championships, including at the 2010 World Rhythmic Gymnastics Championships, 2011 World Rhythmic Gymnastics Championships and 2013 World Rhythmic Gymnastics Championships.

Saeedyokota participated in Miss Universe Japan 2020 and was a top 11 semifinalist.

References

External links

https://database.fig-gymnastics.com/public/gymnasts/biography/14829/true?backUrl=%2Fpublic%2Fresults%2Fdisplay%2F1862%3FidAgeCategory%3D8%26idCategory%3D78%23anchor_2369
http://www.zimbio.com/photos/Nina+Saeed-Yokota/Olympics+Day+16+Gymnastics+Rhythmic/BMOozTxnsFw

1994 births
Living people
Japanese rhythmic gymnasts
Japanese people of Pakistani descent
Place of birth missing (living people)
Gymnasts at the 2012 Summer Olympics
Olympic gymnasts of Japan
Gymnasts from Tokyo
20th-century Japanese women
21st-century Japanese women